The 2013 NACRA Women's Sevens was the ninth tournament of the North America and Caribbean Women's Sevens Championship, the official rugby sevens continental championships organized by NACRA. Both the women's and men's competitions were held at the George Town which was in the Cayman Islands. It was held on 9–10 November. The stadium was the Truman Bodden Stadium as it was also a qualification tournament for the Central America and Caribbean Games which would be held in Mexico.

General
The teams competed in two groups on the first day of the competition in a round-robin format. After the group stage, the teams advanced to the playoff stage beginning with the quarter finals.

On the first day there were no surprises, the favored team which was the Canadian reserves then easily advanced to the finals, in which they defeated the Mexicans.

Three teams, besides Mexico, fulfilling the conditions imposed by the ODECABE earned promotion to the Central America and Caribbean Games.

Group stage

Pool A

Cayman Islands 0-38 Maple Leafs
Mexico 37-0 Turks & Caicos Islands
Maple Leafs 43-0 Turks & Caicos Islands
Cayman Islands 12-35 Mexico
Cayman Islands 17-0 Turks & Caicos Islands
Maple Leafs 54-0 Mexico

Pool B

Trinidad & Tobago 17-12 Bermuda
Jamaica 19-0 Curaçao
Trinidad & Tobago 45-0 Curaçao
Bermuda 14-0 Jamaica
Bermuda 14-10 Curaçao
Trinidad & Tobago 17-5 Jamaica

Knockout Phase

Cup

Bowl Semi-finals
Curaçao 0-43 Jamaica
Turks & Caicos 12-19 Bermuda
Shield final (7th)
Curaçao 17-12 Turks & Caicos

Bowl Final (5th)
Jamaica - Bermuda

Notes

2013
2013 rugby sevens competitions
2013 in North American rugby union
2013 in women's rugby union
International sports competitions hosted by the Cayman Islands
2013 in the Cayman Islands
rugby union